Pla duk may refer to:
A generic name for fishes of the genus Clarias, especially  in Thailand
The broadhead catfish, Clarias macrocephalus
The walking catfish, Clarias batrachus 
Hybrid aquacultured Clarias

Clarias